Geraint Jennings (born 13 May 1966) is a Jersey member of Municipality of St Helier and linguist.

Biography 

Born in Saint Helier, he was educated at Victoria College Preparatory and Christ's Hospital. He graduated from University College, Oxford with a Master of Arts (Oxon) in Modern Languages. Further studies include a Licenciate Diploma in TESOL from Trinity College, London. He is fluent in Russian. His interests include art and illustration. He is the Procureur du Bien Public for the parish of St Helier.

Jèrriais 

He is a teacher of Jèrriais and strongly active in the Société Jersiaise, which is a group dedicated to maintaining Jersey's language, history and culture.

He created Les Pages Jèrriaises, and currently maintains them. He is the resident Jèrriais reporter for the Jersey Evening Post and Parish Matters.

In 2007, he won first place "for the best short story in Norman" at the Fête Nouormande in Bricquebec for his story entitled "La frontchièthe". He won first place again in 2008 for his story entitled "Feu et feunmée".

He has worked on the translation of Lewis Carroll's story Alice's Adventures in Wonderland, which was published in 2012, as L'Travèrs Du Mitheux Et Chein Qu'Alice Y Dêmuchit.

Politics 

Jennings became politically active as a member of the Jersey Green Party. After it disbanded he acted as an independent.

Parish municipality 

He was elected to the Municipality of the Parish of St Helier in 1996 as a member of the Roads Committee and was re-elected in 1999, 2002 and 2005. In his role he masterminded the parish cycling strategy.

Candidacy for Jersey elections 
Jennings has stood for election in the States of Jersey on seven occasions, but not elected:

References

1966 births
Living people
Municipality members of Jersey
People from Saint Helier
Jersey writers
Jersey journalists
Alumni of University College, Oxford
People educated at Christ's Hospital